Bharat Stree Mahamandal was a women's organisation in India founded by Sarala Devi Chaudhurani in Allahabad in 1910. One of the primary goals of the organisation was to promote female education, which at that time was not well developed. The organisation opened several offices in Lahore (then part of undivided India), Allahabad, Delhi, Karachi, Amritsar, Hyderabad, Kanpur, Bankura, Hazaribagh, Midnapur and Kolkata (formerly Calcutta) to improve the situation of women all over India.

References

External links
Women Activists
Early Feminists of Colonial India

Feminist organisations in India
Educational organisations based in India
Women's education in India
1910 establishments in India
Educational institutions established in 1910
Organisations based in Allahabad